Sherwin is an unincorporated community in Cherokee County, Kansas, United States.

History
Sherwin had a post office from 1886 until 1953. The post office was also called Sherwin City and Sherwin Junction for some time.

References

Further reading

External links
 Cherokee County maps: Current, Historic, KDOT

Unincorporated communities in Cherokee County, Kansas
Unincorporated communities in Kansas